In mathematics, Bézout's identity (also called Bézout's lemma), named after Étienne Bézout, is the following theorem:

Many other theorems in elementary number theory, such as  Euclid's lemma or the Chinese remainder theorem, result from Bézout's identity.

A Bézout domain is an integral domain in which Bézout's identity holds. In particular, Bézout's identity holds in principal ideal domains. Every theorem that results from Bézout's identity is thus true in all principal ideal domains.

Structure of solutions

The extended Euclidean algorithm always produces one of these two minimal pairs.

Example

Then the following Bézout's identities are had, with the Bézout coefficients written in red for the minimal pairs and in blue for the other ones.

Proof
Since  is a nonempty set of positive integers, it has a minimum element , by the well-ordering principle.

Since  this implies

Generalizations

For three or more integers

Bézout's identity can be extended to more than two integers: if 

then there are integers  such that

has the following properties:
 d is the smallest positive integer of this form
 every number of this form is a multiple of d

For polynomials

Bézout's identity does not always hold for polynomials.

However, Bézout's identity works for univariate polynomials over a field exactly in the same ways as for integers. In particular the Bézout's coefficients and the greatest common divisor may be computed with the extended Euclidean algorithm.

As the common roots of two polynomials are the roots of their greatest common divisor, Bézout's identity and fundamental theorem of algebra imply the following result: 

The generalization of this result to any number of polynomials and indeterminates is Hilbert's Nullstellensatz.

For principal ideal domains
As noted in the introduction, Bézout's identity works not only in the ring of integers, but also in any other principal ideal domain (PID).

An integral domain in which Bézout's identity holds is called a Bézout domain.

History

French mathematician Étienne Bézout (1730–1783) proved this identity for polynomials. This statement for integers can be found already in the work of an earlier French mathematician, Claude Gaspard Bachet de Méziriac (1581–1638).

See also
 , an analogue of Bézout's identity for homogeneous polynomials in three indeterminates

Notes

External links
 Online calculator for Bézout's identity.
 

Articles containing proofs
Diophantine equations
Lemmas in number theory